Balingoan, officially the Municipality of Balingoan, is a 5th class municipality in the province of Misamis Oriental, Philippines. According to the 2020 census, it has a population of 11,020 people.

History
Formerly part of Talisayan, it gained independence on March 1, 1952. According to the local legend, it derived its name from the word "baling ni juan" (John's Fishing Net), which later on became simply as "Balingoan".

Geography

Barangays
Balingoan is politically subdivided into 9 barangays.
 Baukbauk (Poblacion)
 Dahilig
 Kabangasan
 Kabulakan
 Kauswagan
 Lapinig (Poblacion)
 Mantangale
 Mapua
 San Alonzo

Climate

Demographics

Economy

Produce: Copra, fish, sea shells, fruits, vegetables, animal meat, and dairy products.

Culture

Feast day: May 29. Patron Saint: San Alonzo de Rodriguez

Transportation

Port of Balingoan is the main port for travellers going to the provincial island of Camiguin.

Education

There are 9 Public Elementary Schools situated in Barangays San Alonzo, Bauk-bauk, Lapinig, Mantangale, Mapua, Kauswagan, Kabulakan, Dahilig and Kabangasan.

References

External links
 [ Philippine Standard Geographic Code]
Municipality of Balingoan
Local Governance Performance Management System

Municipalities of Misamis Oriental